Lim Jong-kuk (born April 13, 1968) is a retired football player and goalkeeper coach.

He played in K League Classic side LG Cheetahs, Busan IPark.

References

External links

1968 births
Living people
Association football goalkeepers
South Korean footballers
FC Seoul players
Busan IPark players
K League 1 players
Dankook University alumni